Bofal is a small town in southern Mauritania.  There are phosphate deposits in the vicinity.  It lies near the southern border formed by the Senegal River

Transport 

In 2007, it was proposed to build a railway from Bofal to the coast at Nouakchott to export the phosphate.  There are adjacent phosphate deposits in Senegal.

See also 

 Transport in Mauritania

References 

Populated places in Mauritania
Senegal River